Jakub Adam Rutnicki (born 3 December 1978 in Szamotuły) is a Polish politician. He was born in Szamotuły.

He was elected to the Sejm on 25 September 2005, getting 3,182 votes in 38 Piła district as a candidate from the Civic Platform list. Jakub was also a finalist from the first edition of Idol Poland, finishing ninth.

See also
Members of Polish Sejm 2005-2007

External links
Jakub Rutnicki—parliamentary page—includes declarations of interest, voting record, and transcripts of speeches

1978 births
Living people
People from Szamotuły
Civic Platform politicians
Members of the Polish Sejm 2005–2007
Members of the Polish Sejm 2007–2011
Members of the Polish Sejm 2011–2015
Members of the Polish Sejm 2015–2019
Members of the Polish Sejm 2019–2023
Adam Mickiewicz University in Poznań alumni